Evergreen tree may refer to:

Evergreen, a plant that has leaves throughout the year, making it always green
"Evergreen Tree", a 1960 song performed by Jimmie Rodgers and written by Aaron Schroeder and Wally Gold
"Evergreen Tree", a song by Cliff Richard from his 1960 album Me and My Shadows
Korean novel Sangnoksu (1936), made into two movies titled The Evergreen Tree in 1961 and 1978